Mary Street is a major road in the Brisbane central business district. The street is one of a number that were named after female queens and princesses of the royal family shortly after the penal colony was settled. Charlotte Street is positioned parallel to the north and Margaret Street runs next to the south.

Mary Street begins in the Government Precinct at a T-intersection with George Street opposite the Executive Building. Also at the elevated southern end is Education House containing state government offices and the Department of Mines and Energy, Queensland are located opposite in the Queensland Minerals & Energy Centre. Felix Tower is located on the corner of Mary and Felix Streets. Waterfront Place and Forestry House are nearby in the lower northern section, close to the river.

Vision Brisbane was a planned residential skyscraper on Mary Street that would have been Brisbane's tallest building.

Mary Street was home to the first premises used by the Queensland Club, before moving to the corner of George Street and Alice Street.

In September 2022, the Mary Street Vision was released by the state government.  The planning document is set to transform the street into a subtropical commuter and tourism link. It involves wider footpaths, extra street trees and more small eateries.

Heritage listings

A number of buildings in Mary Street are heritage-listed:

 130-132 Mary Street (Mooneys Building), a warehouse built in 1883 for William Mooney, a Brisbane wholesale and retail tobacconist 
 138 Mary Street, a wine and spirits storehouse built in about 1901 for Perkins Brewery (now Castlemaine Perkins)
 169 Mary Street, a warehouse built in 1887-88 for Queensland pastoralists and politicians William Allan, MLA and William Graham, MLC
 193 Mary Street (Naldham House), a shipping office built initially in 1864 but substantially rebuilt in 1889 for the Australian United Steam Navigation Company

Major intersections

 George Street
 Albert Street
 Edward Street
 Market Street

See also

 Adelaide Street
 Ann Street
 Elizabeth Street
 Queen Street

References

 
Streets in Brisbane